National Sports Council of Zambia (NSCZ) is a sports council based in Zambia. They have considerable power in sports policy in Zambia and were responsible for banning Faz president Kalusha Bwalya from all official sporting engagements.

References

Sport in Zambia